Luciano Boggio Albín (born 10 March 1999) is a Uruguayan footballer who plays as a forward for Argentine club Lanús.

Career
Boggio started his career with Uruguayan side Defensor Sporting, where he has made 43 league appearances and scored 2 goals.

Honours
Uruguay U20
 South American Games silver medal: 2018

References

External links
 
 

Living people
1999 births
Uruguayan footballers
Uruguayan expatriate footballers
Association football midfielders
Footballers from Montevideo
Defensor Sporting players
Club Atlético River Plate (Montevideo) players
Club Atlético Lanús footballers
Uruguayan Primera División players
Argentine Primera División players
South American Games silver medalists for Uruguay
South American Games medalists in football
Uruguayan expatriate sportspeople in Argentina
Expatriate footballers in Argentina